Deep Blue Sea is the soundtrack to the 1999 science fiction horror film Deep Blue Sea. It was released on June 27, 1999 through Warner Bros. Records and consisted of hip hop and R&B music. The soundtrack didn't find much success, only making it to #55 on the Top R&B/Hip-Hop Albums. The lone single was LL Cool J's non-charting "Deepest Bluest".

Track listing
"Deepest Bluest"- 4:22 - LL Cool J 
"Smokeman"- 2:39 - Smokeman 
"I Found Another Man"- 4:11 - Natice 
"Remote Control Soul"- 4:22 - Bass Odyssey
"Mega's on His Own"- 5:16 - Cormega (ft. Carl Thomas)  
"Come Home with Me"- 3:50 - Amyth 
"Say What"- 3:43 - LL Cool J 
"Burn Baby Burn"- 3:35 - Simone Starks 
"Just Because"- 4:10 - F.A.T.E. 
"Get tha Money"- 4:27 - Hi-C (ft. DJ Quik)  
"I Can See Clearly Now"- 5:15 - Chantel Jones
"El Paraiso Rico"- 3:27 - Deetah 
"Good and Plenty"- 3:49 - Divine
"Deep Blue Sea Montage"- 6:12 - Trevor Rabin

References

Hip hop soundtracks
1999 soundtrack albums
Warner Records soundtracks
Albums produced by DJ Quik
Science fiction film soundtracks
Horror film soundtracks
Deep Blue Sea (film series)